Clarence Adam Vinson (born July 10, 1978 in Washington, D.C.) is an American boxer.  Nicknamed "Untouchable", Vinson won the bantamweight bronze medal at the 2000 Summer Olympics.

Amateur career
Vinson was also the 1997 and 1998 United States amateur Flyweight champion and the 1999 United States Amateur Bantamweight champion.

Olympic results 
 Defeated Rachid Bouaita (France) 9-2
 Defeated Talaybek Kadyraliev (Kyrgyzstan) 12-7
 Defeated George Olteanu (Romania) 26-19
 Lost to Guillermo Rigondeaux (Cuba) 6-18

Pro career
Vinson began his professional career in 2001, compiling a record of 17-2-0.  He lost against Heriberto Ruiz and a decision to Mexico's César Morales in 2004.
He TKO'd Jose German Cruz (December 2006).

References 
 

1978 births
Living people
Boxers from Washington, D.C.
Boxers at the 2000 Summer Olympics
Bantamweight boxers
Olympic bronze medalists for the United States in boxing
Winners of the United States Championship for amateur boxers
American male boxers
Medalists at the 2000 Summer Olympics